Drew Thomas Rasmussen (born July 27, 1995) is an American professional baseball pitcher for the Tampa Bay Rays of Major League Baseball (MLB). He previously played for the Milwaukee Brewers, for whom he made his MLB debut in 2020.

Amateur career
Rasmussen attended Mt. Spokane High School in Mead, Washington, and later attended the Oregon State University where he played college baseball for the Beavers.  Prior to his freshman season Rasmussen was drafted by the Arizona Diamondbacks in the 39th round of the 2014 MLB draft.  On March 21, 2015, as a freshman, he pitched the only perfect game in the team's history, in a 3–0 victory over Washington State. He was drafted 31st overall in the 2017 Major League Baseball draft by the Tampa Bay Rays but did not sign.

Rasmussen underwent his second Tommy John surgery in September 2017 which forced him to miss all of the 2018 season.

Professional career

Milwaukee Brewers
Despite missing the 2018 season, Rasmussen was still drafted by the Milwaukee Brewers in the sixth round of the 2018 Major League Baseball draft.

On August 13, 2020, Rasmussen was selected to the active roster. He made his major league debut on August 19 against the Minnesota Twins and threw 2 scoreless innings. Rasmussen began the 2021 season in the Milwaukee bullpen. He recorded 1 save in 15 games for the Brewers.

Tampa Bay Rays
On May 21, 2021, the Brewers traded Rasmussen and J. P. Feyereisen to the Tampa Bay Rays in exchange for Willy Adames and Trevor Richards. Rasmussen pitched eight perfect innings before losing the perfect game in the ninth inning on August 14, 2022.
In 2022, Rasmussen was named American League Pitcher of the Month for August, when he registered a 3–1 record in six starts to go along with a 1.57 ERA and 33 strikeouts against only four walks.

Personal life
Rasmussen and his wife, Stevie, married in 2020. They welcomed a son, Rhett, on September 6, 2022.

References

External links

Oregon State Beavers bio

1995 births
Living people
People from Spokane County, Washington
People from Puyallup, Washington
Baseball players from Washington (state)
Major League Baseball pitchers
Milwaukee Brewers players
Tampa Bay Rays players
Oregon State Beavers baseball players
Wisconsin Timber Rattlers players
Carolina Mudcats players
Biloxi Shuckers players
Durham Bulls players